Gisborne Boys' High School is a boys' secondary school situated in Gisborne, New Zealand. It was founded as a co-educational school in 1909 as Gisborne High School. In 1956, the school became Gisborne Boys' High School when it was split into two single-sex schools.

Gisborne High School's First Fifteen Rugby Team had its first rugby game against Napier Boys’ High School in 1911. Since then it has produced many professional rugby players including Hosea Gear and Rico Gear. The school's First Fifteen rugby team has toured many countries competing in various competitions. The team played in the Sanix World Rugby Youth Invitational Tournament which was held in Japan. Gisborne Boys' High reached the Semi-Finals of the tournament but were beaten by Glenwood High School, which won the tournament.

Notable alumni

The Arts 
Witi Ihimaera - author

Politics 
Ron Bailey - former Labour Member of Parliament.
Charles Chauvel - serving Labour Member of Parliament, dux of the school in 1985.  Chauvel was also senior swimming champion of the school that year.
Gareth Hughes - Green Party Member of Parliament.
Tutekawa Wyllie - former New Zealand First Member of Parliament.

Public service  
 Arnold Reedy (1903-1971), Māori leader

Science 
Don Merton - conservationist best known for saving the black robin from extinction, attended Gisborne High School (1953-1956).

Sport 
Craig Clarke, rugby union player (Connacht Rugby) (1994-1999)
Hosea Gear, rugby union player (All Blacks)
Rico Gear, rugby union player (All Blacks); attended (1991–1998), former Prefect (1998)
Miah Nikora, rugby union player; 
Maz Quinn, world-class surfer, attended 1991–1996, former Prefect (1996)
Sheridan Rangihuna, rugby union player-New Zealand national under-20 rugby union team & New Zealand national schoolboy rugby union team
Grant Robinson, cricket player
Ross Nicholson, Football Player, New Zealand Under-19, New Zealand All White, Sembawang Rangers FC (Singapore), FIFA Club World Cup, FIFA Confederations cup; Attended 1988-1993

Sport 
Last time Gisborne Boys' High School first XV won the National Secondary Schools final was in 2007 against Mount Albert Grammar School where they defeated the Aucklanders 36–24.

See also
Gisborne Girls' High School
List of schools in New Zealand

References

External links
Gisborne Boys' High School official site

Boarding schools in New Zealand
Educational institutions established in 1956
Boys' schools in New Zealand
Gisborne, New Zealand
Schools in Gisborne, New Zealand
Secondary schools in New Zealand
1956 establishments in New Zealand